Ceredigion Historical Society (formally the Cardiganshire Antiquarian Society) was founded in 1909.

History

Founding members included: Revd George Eyre Evans, Llewellyn John Montford Bebb, Revd Professor E. Tyrrell-Green (Chairman), Revd J Francis Lloyd and Sir Edward Webley-Parry-Pryse (President)

The Society name changed to the Ceredigion Historical Society in 2002 from the Cardiganshire Antiquarian Society.

The Society produces regular Journals by the name of Ceredigion.

References

External links
Ceredigion Historical Society

History of Ceredigion